Grant Esterhuizen  (born 28 April 1976) was a South African former rugby union player.

Playing career
Esterhizen matriculated at Afrikaanse Hoër Seunskool and represented  at the annual Craven Week tournaments in 1993 and 1994.

Esterhuizen made his test match debut for the Springboks as a substitute against  at Jade Stadium, Christchurch in 2000 and played in seven test matches during the 2000 rugby season. In 2003, he represented South Africa at sevens.

Test history

See also
List of South Africa national rugby union players – Springbok no. 692

References

1976 births
Living people
South African rugby union players
South Africa international rugby union players
Blue Bulls players
Bulls (rugby union) players
Golden Lions players
Lions (United Rugby Championship) players
Stormers players
South Africa international rugby sevens players
Rugby union players from the Northern Cape
Rugby union centres
Rugby union wings